is a retired Japanese judoka.

Career
Kaori Matsumoto started judo at the age of 6. Iwai Judo Juku, the school she attended, also worked on wrestling once a week. Therefore, she brought a stance of leaning forward, similar to that of wrestling, to judo. As an elementary school student, she won medals at national wrestling competitions. In judo, she won her first national tournament when she was in her senior year of junior high school.

Her favorite techniques are Kosoto gari, Sode tsurikomi goshi and Newaza. She broke her right shoulder during high school, her nasal bone and right elbow during college, and her right hand during the 2009 world championship due to an unbalanced diet and finished fifth. After those events, she began to control her eating habits and learned the importance of food education. She then won the International Conventions championship 7 times in a row, from the World Masters of January 2010 to the Grand Slam Tokyo of December 2010.

She won the gold medal in the lightweight (57 kg) division at the 2010 World Judo Championships. In August 2011, she finished third at the World Championships in Paris. In December, she won the gold medal at the Grand Slam Tokyo.

In 2012, Kaori won gold medals at the Masters in January and at the Düsseldorf Grand Prix in February. The same year, Kaori Matsumoto won gold at the 2012 Summer Olympics over Romanian Corina Căprioriu after the latter was disqualified during the golden score period in the women's -57 kg final, winning Japan's first gold medal of the 2012 games and their only gold in the Judo event.

After 2012 Summer Olympics, she started to do volunteer work for kids in Japan. Kaori Matsumoto voiced a motorcycle policewoman modeled after her in the 2013 movie Dragon Ball Z: Battle of Gods.

On 26 August 2015 she won the gold medal in the under 57 kg woman's division at the 2015 World Judo Championships in Kazakhstan.

She finished third at the 2016 Olympics.

She retired in 2019.

She is married with two children.

References

External links
 
 
 

1987 births
Living people
People from Kanazawa, Ishikawa
Japanese female judoka
Asian Games medalists in judo
Judoka at the 2012 Summer Olympics
Judoka at the 2016 Summer Olympics
Olympic judoka of Japan
Olympic gold medalists for Japan
Olympic bronze medalists for Japan
Sportspeople from Ishikawa Prefecture
Olympic medalists in judo
Medalists at the 2012 Summer Olympics
Medalists at the 2016 Summer Olympics
Judoka at the 2010 Asian Games
World judo champions
Asian Games gold medalists for Japan
Recipients of the Medal with Purple Ribbon
Medalists at the 2010 Asian Games
21st-century Japanese women